List of winners and nominees of the Anugerah Sukan Negara: Sportswoman of the Year.

List of winners and nominees

References

See also
Anugerah Sukan Negara for Sportsman of the Year
Athlete of the Year

Anugerah Sukan Negara